Mavrik Bourque (born January 8, 2002) is a Canadian professional ice hockey centre for the Texas Stars of the American Hockey League (AHL) as a prospect for the Dallas Stars of the National Hockey League (NHL). He was drafted in the first round, 30th overall, by the Stars in the 2020 NHL Entry Draft.

Playing career
Bourque played major junior hockey with the Shawinigan Cataractes of the Quebec Major Junior Hockey League (QMJHL). He was drafted 30th overall by the Dallas Stars in the 2020 NHL Entry Draft. On March 1, 2021, Bourque was signed to a three-year, entry-level contract by the Stars.

Career statistics

Regular season and playoffs

International

References

External links
 

2002 births
Living people
Canadian ice hockey centres
Dallas Stars draft picks
Ice hockey people from Quebec
National Hockey League first-round draft picks
Shawinigan Cataractes players
Texas Stars players